Alexander Nikolayev (1918 – 2009) was a Russian World War II hero

Aleksandr Nikolayev may also refer to:

 Aleksandr Nikolayev (canoeist) (born 1990), Russian canoeist
 Aleksandr Nikolayev (footballer) (born 1993), Russian/Ukrainian football player
 Aleksandr Nikolayev (painter) (1897–1957), Soviet painter of Russian origin, who lived and worked in Uzbek SSR
 Aleksandr Nikolayev (pianist) (1903–1980), Russian pianist and musicologist 
 Aleksandr Nikolayev, an Ivan Rogov-class landing ship of the Soviet, later Russian, Navy